Pier Ludovico Pavoni (born 25 April 1926) was an Italian cinematographer, director, producer and screenwriter.

Born in Rome, Pavoni graduated from the Centro Sperimentale di Cinematografia as a camera operator in 1948 and started working in several documentary films, as a camera assistant to Leonida Barboni and  Mario Craveri. In 1952 he debuted as a cinematographer in a segment of the comedy film Marito e moglie directed by Eduardo De Filippo. Among other things, he photographed a considerable number of peplum films. Between 1960 and 1971 Pavoni also worked as a producer for the company "Dear". He also directed three successful films in the mid-1970s, two of them based on his own screenplays. He retired in 1989.

In 1956, Pavoni  received the award for best photography for Un po' di cielo at the San Sebastián International Film Festival. In 1959 he won the Nastro d'Argento for the cinematography of La muraglia cinese.

Selected filmography
 Husband and Wife (1952)
 Mill of the Stone Women (1960)

References

External links 
 

1926 births
20th-century Italian people
Italian cinematographers
Italian film directors
Italian film producers
Italian screenwriters
Italian male screenwriters
Film people from Rome
Nastro d'Argento winners
Centro Sperimentale di Cinematografia alumni
Living people